Hayfa Sdiri ( Hayfā’ Sdīrī, born 1997) is a Tunisian entrepreneur, activist and blogger.

In 2016, she founded Entr@crush, an online platform for future entrepreneurs.

In 2019, she was listed among the BBC's 100 Women, a list of 100 inspiring and influential women.

References

External links
Entr@crush

Tunisian women activists
Tunisian women in business
BBC 100 Women
21st-century Tunisian women
Paris Dauphine University alumni